Molly Daniels is an Australian actress, director, and producer. She is best known for her roles in You're Skitting Me, Tomorrow When the War Began, Ronny Chieng: International Student and Very Small Business. She has also written, directed, created, and produced web series and songs, and hosted the children's podcast Short and Curly.

Early life and education
Daniels knew from a very young age that she wanted to be a performer, especially in comedy. This was due to the influence of her family: her mother is actress Robyn Butler, and her stepfather is actor Wayne Hope, and Daniels grew up in a household with comedy. Her mother recalled "Our girls are both really funny. They take great pride in being able to make us laugh, and I'm a particularly good audience for them.".

While she was a student, the casting team of You're Skitting Me visited the school to cast actors for characters. She auditioned, got a part for a show and got an agent. After graduating from secondary education, she studied film and television at Swinburne University in 2014. She studied at the iO Theatre in Chicago, USA.

Career
She began her acting career in 2004 in a flower girl role in Stories from the Golf. She got attention and had her first break by acting on You're Skitting Me and played Ellie's lead role in Tomorrow When the War Began. She also starred in the comedy series Back in Very Small Business, playing Sam Angel as a lead role. She had her first leading role, 'Asher' throughout the Ronny Chieng: International student series. Throughout her career, she participated in various forms of media such as short films, films, and television series such as Party Tricks, The Librarian, Stories from The Golf, and Fans Forever. In an interview, she mentioned that her goal is to do a half-hour sitcom in the comedy field as it has been her interest, and she produces it with her friends. Also, in another interview, she said that as she loves her work, she is looking forward to more writing; for example, a series of books can be ideal.

Molly Daniels said she faced a challenge when filming for Tomorrow When the War began. In previous works, such as 'You're Skitting Me', she played four or five different characters a day because the structure of a show is jumping around sketches. However, in Tomorrow When the War Began, the program's weight was more significant than the You're Skitting Me structure. She had to play the same character for six episodes and nine weeks of shooting. Moreover, more effort was required as an actor as there was a film beforehand, she wanted to keep the audience's interest via experimental ideas while keeping characters and identities from the books. Furthermore, it was physically challenging as well because there were some pretty hardcore stunts, such as real bombs and explosions scenes. Hence, she had to get fire alarm training and how to use guns, and despite the training, she got some injuries. Also, an average day on set will start from 5 o'clock morning if they film far away. Due to a characteristic of a film, there were many moving throughout the shooting and sometimes it took an hour to be out of the country. They will get through six or seven big scenes in one day and somedays it involves night shoots that involve an actor's energy and determination.

She worked on two movies every year throughout her career, at least one show every year. She worked in comedy, drama, action, adventure, documentary, and talk shows.

Other ventures
She said the reason she could explore various media platforms because she experienced all the things she could. When she was young she tried a lot of activities, figuring out that she likes guitar, drama and writing, but dislikes sports.

She began directing and writing for the show You're Skitting Me and lyrics for songs in the comedy show Upper Middle Bogan. She participated in all parts of production in Young Love, an eight-part web series, and Double Date Night. She also participated in and directed the behind-the-scenes featurettes of the ASB show Little Lunch, and worked as a drama coach. She wrote for The InBESTigators, a children's series, and participated as a host and co-host for the podcast Short & Curly for kids and their parents.

As a producer and director, Daniels worked on the small scale of media such as shows and web series rather than blockbuster movies, as she likes to put her insights or values into the work. For instance, Double date night, a TV series based on two best friends or housemates, Vic and Riley, about going on a double date every Wednesday. Molly Daniel later says that it was a project with her passion as she wanted to compose a female-led comedy focusing on love and dating in various forms. Also, a comedy web series 'Celebration Nation' explores a new definition of the media environment. Series challenges male-dominated or centred production as it centres ethnically and sexually diverse women with crews, making it three cis-gendered. Thus, Molly Daniels seeks diversity and alterations, such as hiring fresh faces, because, throughout her career, she has been surrounded by full of middle-aged white men. As for herself, she changed the world by including the people, listening to and respecting other people, and finding out what she could do to help them. In return, people will listen and do the same, resulting in a positive feedback loop.

As a writer, Molly Daniel gets inspired by shows in various aspects of daily life. For instance, celebration nation, the concept emerged from the two-week quarantine and shift in perspectives as she decided to focus on the situations rather than the people working in retail. Also, Gaby and Jenny, who operated the show together, brainstormed the ideas that led to their wanting to do something their age, 20s but were not overdone, such as a dating show. Hence, they chose retails that they all had an experience with and knew they could do it well. They put random ideas until they got stuck, but in the end, they try to make it relate to at least one highlight retail moment and one holiday moment. For a Double date night, she wrote it as therapy when she had a crush on this guy about him and her talking, which became characters and then a date idea came later on. Moreover, Molly Daniel also focuses on the show's values, community, and themes when she writes. For instance, The InBESTigators, an Australian mockumentary children's television series that discusses friendship, responsibility, teamwork, and the aspects of children's lives, focused primarily on the nature of 10 years old rather than comedy itself. Furthermore, in a podcast, Short & Curly, she discusses ethical questions with kids and the experts, such as "Should you move to Mars?", "Is it ever OK to lie" and "Can you trust a robot?". This leads to how kids think about specific topics and learn values that are more than just entertainment television shows.

She has her way of working with various mediums and roles that Molly Daniel works. For instance, the releasing strategy. She releases week by week with a strict deadline from the start, as in the past, she had experiences that she drawn out the whole process. In addition, she recruits actors and crews based on her social network. She went to Swinburne for a year to do a film and tv course, which let her know different people and extended her social network. It's how she recruited people for Double Date Night. Also, Juliet, who co-produced the work, knew various people as well as she graduated from Swinburne and helped organise everythin. It was a crew that knew each other. For a Casting wise, improvisers worked with them and actors are known or known of and few random casts. Similarly, for Celebration Nation, Jenny and Gabby, who are friends of Molly, re-connected in 2020 LA. Later, Jenny came up to Gabby and Molly with an opportunity to write a show, pitch ideas, and get selected from Screen Australia.

Danielx also works with a family such as The InBESTigators, The Librarians and Upper Middle Bogan. Her mother and father work as writers, producers, and directors for most shows, and she is a writer or director. Having a parent working in a media environment with their production company, Gristmill naturally leads to collaboration. Moreover, she filmed a YouTube video with her mum about how to make White Wine Pasta, and she has a YouTube channel. Her YouTube channel consists of 9 videos from 2010 to 2015. These videos contain various aspects of Molly Daniel, such as birthday video messages to a friend, how to style hair, a dating guide, song covers and more.

Her talents led to the establishment of her own production company, Yung Victoria, in 2016. Through Yung Victoria, Double date night, The Y2KBug got created, produced, edited and promoted. They also opened a competition Unscene short film competition in 2017 and 2018.

Script and Continuity Department

Art Department

Thanks

Self

Drama Coach

Editor

Podcast

Writer

Director&Producer

Filmography

Film

Television

Awards and recognitions
Throughout her acting career she did not win awards but in 2021, she was nominated as a Best Short Form Comedy for Celebration Nation shared with Jenny Zhou and Gaby Seow in AACTA Award.

References

External links
 

Australian television actresses
Living people
Year of birth missing (living people)
21st-century Australian women
Swinburne University of Technology alumni
Australian women writers